The Congress of Angostura was convened by Simón Bolívar and took place in Angostura (today Ciudad Bolívar) during the wars of Independence of Colombia and Venezuela, culminating in the proclamation of the Republic of Colombia (historiographically called Gran Colombia ). It met from February 15, 1819, established the new independent-from-Spain nation on December 17, was interrupted by further independentist activity, and reconvened on July 31, 1821, when the Congress of Cúcuta began its sessions. The Angostura assembly consisted of twenty-six delegates representing Venezuela and New Granada (today Colombia).

Historical background 
Important parts of the countries were still under Spanish rule, so elections only took place in the areas of southern Venezuela and Margarita Island controlled by the patriot forces. The delegates from New Granada were chosen from among the exiles fighting alongside the Venezuelan patriots. At its first meeting on February 19, 1819, Bolivar gave his famous Address at Angostura, but not all of the proposals contained in it were accepted (most notably the suggestions of a highly exalted ceremonial president-for-life who would govern through powerful ministers accountable to parliament and a hereditary senate, both modeled on the British example, and a "fourth" branch of government, the "moral" one, loosely modeled on the Classical Areopagus).

The Congress of Angostura is considered Venezuela's second legislative congress, the first being the one that met in 1811. Its culminating piece of legislation was the Venezuelan Constitution of 1819, officially adopted on August 15, but quickly made obsolete by the creation of the Republic of Colombia on December 17, 1819. This new nation comprised Venezuela, New Granada (today Colombia and Panamá) and Quito (today Ecuador).  In order to differentiate it from the present Republic of Colombia, historians have traditionally called the nation Gran Colombia. A constitution for the new nation was created at the Congress of Cúcuta in August 1821.

The congress established three large departments for the new country: Venezuela (corresponding to the modern country of Venezuela), Cundinamarca (what today is Colombia, Panama and some parts of Central America) and Quito (today Ecuador).  Simon Bolívar was elected president, Francisco Antonio Zea vice president, Juan Germán Roscio vice president of Venezuela and Francisco de Paula Santander vice president of Cundinamarca.

The Fundamental Law of the Republic of Colombia (1819)

Contents of the Fundamental Law 
On December 17, 1819, the Fundamental Law of the Republic of Colombia (Ley Fundamental de Colombia, in Spanish) was enacted by the congressmen in the city of Angostura (nowadays Ciudad Bolívar). It consisted on fourteen articles in which the Republic of Gran Colombia established its political structure, considering the fact that "the provinces of Venezuela and New Grenada (sic)" are "united in a single republic" that could not stand if divided in two different nations, even if they are "united by the closes ties". Therefore, the birth of Gran Colombia would be created "by necessity and mutual interest".

Basically, the document explained how Colombia was going to be as an independent nation, in relation to the reasons that motivated the political union of Venezuela and New Granada. Then, the Fundamental Law of the Republic of Colombia is as follows:
 From 1819, the Republic of Colombia is created from the fusion of Venezuela and New Granada, both nations with republican system.
 The captain-generalship of Venezuela and the viceroyalty of New Granada join together their territories, which comprise "an extent of a hundred and fifteen thousand square leagues".
 The national debt of Colombia consolidates "in solidum" the debts of both Venezuela and New Granada debts.
 The executive power is in the hands of the president and the vice-president, "both to be provisionally appointed by the present congress".
 Venezuela, Quito and Cundinamarca are the three great departments of the Gran Colombia; the name of the last one substitutes the old New Granada. Their respective capitals are Caracas, Quito and Bogotá.
 The departments have superior administrations and chiefs.
 The capital of Colombia is named after Bolívar. Its "place and situation" is to be determined by the congress.
 Rosario de Cúcuta shall be the village in which the congress of Colombia would assemble, on January 1821.
 The congress will form the Constitution of the Republic of Colombia.
 In the same way, the congress shall determine "the arms and flag of Colombia". The colors will be the Venezuelan ones, since they were "being most known".
 On January 15, 1820, the congress "shall adjourn"; then new elections to the congress can take place.
 The congress shall be replaced by a six-members committee and a president.
 On December 25, 1819, "in commemoration of the birth of the Saviour of the world", the Republic of Colombia shall be proclaimed through public celebrations.
 The aforesaid date, i.e. on December, shall be the anniversary of the Republic, due to its "political regeneration".

Deputies who signed the Fundamental Law 
At the end of the Fundamental Law appeared the signatures of Francisco Antonio Zea, who was the president of the congress, and Diego de Vallenilla, a deputy and secretary. Other politicians who signed the document were: Juan Germán Roscio, Manuel Cedeño, Juan Martínez, José España, Luis Tomás Peraza, Antonio M. Briceño, Eusebio Afanador, Francisco Conde, Diego Bautista Urbaneja, Juan Vicente Cardozo, Ignacio Muñoz, Onofre Basalo, Domingo Alzuru, José Tomás Machado and Ramón García Cádiz.

Finally, Simón Bolívar approved the printing, publication and implementation of the Fundamental Law, with the stamp of the State.

Notes

External links
Ley Fundamental de Colombia in Spanish, available at Cervantes Virtual.
Simón Bolívar. "Message to the Congress of Angostura, 1819" at the Internet Modern History Sourcebook.
 Speech of Angostura in Spanish.

Gran Colombia
Colonial Colombia
Colonial Venezuela
History of the Viceroyalty of New Granada
Independence of Colombia
Independence of Venezuela
1819 in Gran Colombia
1819 in the Viceroyalty of New Granada
1820 in Gran Colombia
1821 in Gran Colombia
Constituent assemblies
1819 establishments in Gran Colombia